The International Figure Skating Competition was held in November 14–16, 1975. Medals were awarded in the disciplines of men's singles and ladies' singles.

Results

Men

Ladies

References

Rude Pravo Archiv, 17.11.1975, Page 7

Prague Skate
Prague